Basiret (Ottoman Turkish: Insightfulness) was an Ottoman daily newspaper which was published in Constantinople in the period 1869–1879. It was one of the most read newspapers of that period and had a pan-Islamist approach.

History and profile
Basiret was established by Ali Efendi, a journalist, in 1869, and the first issue appeared on 23 January 1870. He was also the publisher of the paper and began to be known as Basiretçi Ali Efendi due to the popularity of the paper. He was financed by German Chancellor Otto von Bismarck in getting printing machines to launch the paper.  

Basiret sold 40,000 copies in the first year. Then it enjoyed both high levels of circulation and of influence among the Turks living in the Empire. The readers of the paper were mostly conservative Muslims. Major contributors included Ali Suavi, Namık Kemal and Ahmet Mithat. Basiret covered critical articles about the bureaucratic structure of the Ottoman Empire. 

Basiret had links to the Young Ottomans movement. During the Franco-Prussian War in 1870-1871 the paper supported the Germans. It became a platform for the pan-Islamist and pan-Turkist figures leaving its objective approach at the beginning of the Russo-Turkish War in 1877.

References
 

1869 establishments in the Ottoman Empire
1879 disestablishments in the Ottoman Empire
Daily newspapers published in Turkey
Defunct newspapers published in the Ottoman Empire
Newspapers published in Istanbul
Pan-Islamism
Publications established in 1869
Publications disestablished in 1879
Turkish-language newspapers